George T. Dickerson is a Democratic member of the Mississippi Senate, representing the 43rd District since 2008, and previously from 1993 through 2003.

External links
Mississippi State Senate - Tommy Dickerson's official government website
Project Vote Smart - Senator Tommy Dickerson (MS) profile
Follow the Money - Tommy Dickerson
2007 2003 1999 campaign contributions

1945 births
Living people
People from Pascagoula, Mississippi
Democratic Party Mississippi state senators